Pramod Kumar Satapathy, AC was the Assistant Commandant of the Special Operation Group of Odisha Special Armed Police, which comes under India's Odisha Police who was awarded India's highest peace time gallantry award Ashoka Chakra. 

On the night of 15 February 2008, about 500 armed naxalites attacked the police at various locations in and around Bhubaneshwar, Odisha, India. On hearing this news, Shri Satapathy along with just 20 available police personnel reached inside the jungle in Nayagarh and launched an assault on the hiding militants. In the ensuing encounter, Shri Satapathy bravely led the operations but ultimately got killed in action.

Ashoka Chakra awardee 
For this act of courage, the President of India posthumously awarded him with the Ashok Chakra on Republic Day, 2009.

The official citation for the Ashoka Chakra Award reads:

References

2008 deaths
Year of birth missing

Recipients of the Ashoka Chakra (military decoration)
Naxalite–Maoist insurgency
Odisha Police
Indian police officers killed in the line of duty
Ashoka Chakra